Hagfors Airport is an airport near Hagfors, Värmland County, Sweden . The airport is served by a single route operated under public service obligation. It saw 2406 passengers In 2014.

Airlines and destinations

Statistics

References

Airports in Sweden
Buildings and structures in Värmland County